

Buildings and structures

Buildings

Construction (by year):
 1601
 Jerónimos Monastery at Belém (Lisbon) in Portugal is completed after 100 years.
 In Naples (Italy), the fountain La Fontana dell'Immacolatella, made of white and gray marble, is built by Michelangelo Naccherino and Pietro Bernini; it is adorned with coats of arms and eagles, and the central coat of arms is upheld by two angels.
 In Japan, Inuyama Castle is built in Aichi Prefecture (remodeled in 1620).
 1602–1604 – Vleeshal, Haarlem, North Holland, designed by Lieven de Key, built.
 1604
 August – In Amritsar, Punjab, the Harmandir Sahib is inaugurated.
 In Korea, Bulguksa is reconstructed.
 In Paris (France), the Pont Neuf over the Seine (begun in 1578 by Jean Baptiste Androuet du Cerceau) is opened to traffic (completed in July 1606; royal inauguration in 1607).
 1605
 In Gdańsk, the Old Arsenal, designed by Anthony van Obberghen, Jan Strakowski and Abraham van den Blocke, is completed.
 In Padua (Veneto), renovation is finished on the Palazzo del Capitanio palace arch and Torre dell'Orologio clock tower (expanded 1599–1605).
 In Rome, building is begun on Santa Maria della Vittoria (as San Paolo), designed by Carlo Maderno.
 In England, the Red Hall at Bourne, Lincolnshire, is built.
 In India, the Jahangir Mahal, Orchha, is built.
 1607
 January 19 – San Agustin Church (Manila), designed by Juan Macías, is completed.
 1608
 In England, The Great Hall, the first part of the mansion house of Bank Hall in Bretherton, Lancashire, is constructed.
 In Korea, Jongmyo is reconstructed.
 1609 – Our Lady of the Immaculate Conception Church, Goa.

Births
 1606
 Charles Errard, French painter, architect and engraver (died 1689)
 Giovanni Francesco Grimaldi, Italian architect and painter (died 1680)

Deaths
 1604 – Giacomo del Duca, Italian sculptor and architect (born c. 1520)
 1607: July 24 – Alessandro Pieroni, Italian mannerist painter and architect (born 1550)
 1607 or 1609 – Vittorio Cassar, Maltese architect (born c. 1550)
 1608: June 25 or 26 – Bernardo Buontalenti, Florentine mannerist architect, stage designer, military engineer and artist (born c. 1531)

Architecture